The following are the football (soccer) events of the year 1969 throughout the world.

Events
Copa Libertadores 1969: Won by Estudiantes de La Plata after defeating Nacional on an aggregate score of 3–0.
May 28 – A.C. Milan defeats Ajax, 4–1, to win their second European Cup.
September 9 – Dutch side FC Twente makes its European debut with a defeat (2–0) in France against FC Rouen.

Winners club national championship

Asia
 : Al-Oruba

Europe
 : Leeds United
 : AS Saint-Étienne
 : Újpest FC
 : ACF Fiorentina
 : Feyenoord Rotterdam
 : Celtic
 : Real Madrid
 : Galatasaray S.K.
 : Bayern Munich

North America
: Cruz Azul
  / : 
 Kansas City Spurs (NASL)

South America
 
 Chacarita Juniors – Metropolitano
 Boca Juniors – Nacional
 : Palmeiras
 : Universidad de Chile
 : Club Guaraní

International tournaments
1969 British Home Championship (May 3–10, 1969)

Births

 January 4 – Kees van Wonderen, Dutch footballer and manager
 January 10 – Robert Maaskant, Dutch footballer and manager
 January 12 – Robert Prosinečki, Croatian footballer
 January 24 – Silvan Inia, Dutch footballer
 January 24 – Carlos Soca, Uruguayan footballer
 February 21 – Lukas Tudor, Chilean footballer
 March 21 – Ali Daei, Iranian footballer
 March 21 – Eber Moas, Uruguayan footballer
 April 20 – Diego Herrera, Ecuadorian footballer
 May 10 – Dennis Bergkamp, Dutch footballer
 June 15 – Oliver Kahn, German footballer
 June 25 – Jurgen Streppel, Dutch footballer and manager
 June 29 – Erik Tammer, Dutch footballer
 August 15 – Carlos Roa, Argentine footballer
 September 4 – Silviano Delgado, Mexican footballer 
 September 9 – Gert Aandewiel, Dutch footballer and manager
 September 15 – Energio Díaz, Ecuadorian footballer
 September 15 – Roberto Solozábal, Spanish footballer
 September 20 – Richard Witschge, Dutch footballer
 October 13 – José Eduardo Pavez, Mexican footballer
 October 23 – Ricardo Cadena, Mexican footballer
 October 26 – César Obando, Honduran footballer
 October 31 – Ricardo Sanabria, Paraguayan footballer
 November 12 – David Rangel, Mexican footballer
 November 19 – Igor Pamić, Croatian footballer
 November 25 – Mark Quamina, English former professional footballer
 November 27 – Hermán Gaviria, Colombian footballer
 November 29 – Tomas Brolin, Swedish footballer
 November 29 – Pierre van Hooijdonk, Dutch footballer
 December 3 – Jan Ekholm, Swedish footballer
 December 5 – David Villabona, Spanish footballer 
 December 6 – Jörg Heinrich, German footballer
 December 28 – Alberto Macías, Mexican footballer
 December 28 – Juan Reynoso, Peruvian footballer

Deaths

 January 8 – Elmar Kaljot, Estonian footballer and coach (68)
 June 30 – Domingo Tejera, Uruguayan defender, winner of the 1930 FIFA World Cup. (69)
 July 24 - Wilhelm Trautmann, German footballer (81)
 August 14 – Bruno Chizzo, Italian midfielder, winner of the 1938 FIFA World Cup. (53)
 September 6 – Arthur Friedenreich, Brazilian striker, claimed to have scored 1329 goals in 1239 matches. (77)
 October 11 – Enrique Ballestrero, Uruguayan goalkeeper, winner of the 1930 FIFA World Cup. (64)

References

 
Association football by year